Proctonotus is a genus of sea slugs, or more accurately nudibranchs, marine gastropod molluscs in the family Proctonotidae.

Species
Species in the genus Proctonotus include:
 Proctonotus mucroniferus (Alder & Hancock, 1844)
Species brought into synonymy  
 Proctonotus affinis Burn, 1958: synonym of Caldukia affinis (Burn, 1958)
 Proctonotus orientalis Kelaart, 1858 : synonym of Polybranchia orientalis (Kelaart, 1858)

References

 http://www.seaslugforum.net/ accessed 10 November 2009
 Gofas, S.; Le Renard, J.; Bouchet, P. (2001). Mollusca, in: Costello, M.J. et al. (Ed.) (2001). European register of marine species: a check-list of the marine species in Europe and a bibliography of guides to their identification. Collection Patrimoines Naturels, 50: pp. 180–213

Proctonotidae